Fredrik "Fred" Teeven (born 5 August 1958) is a Dutch jurist, bus driver and former politician and prosecutor. A member of the People's Party for Freedom and Democracy (VVD), he served as State Secretary at the Ministry of Security and Justice from 2010 until his resignation in 2015 alongside that of Minister Ivo Opstelten.

Teeven served as a member of the House of Representatives and parliamentary leader of the Livable Netherlands party in the House of Representatives from 23 May 2002 until 30 January 2003. In 2003 he rejoined the People's Party for Freedom and Democracy and after general election of 2006 again served as a member of the House of Representatives from 30 November 2006 until 14 October 2010 when he became State Secretary for Security and Justice under the First and Second Rutte cabinets. After the general election of 2012 he served as a member of the House of Representatives from 20 September 2012 until 5 November 2012 and again from 26 March 2015 until 23 March 2017.

Early career
Teeven was born in the province of North Holland. He studied law at the Vrije Universiteit Amsterdam and public management at the University of Twente. Working first as a tax collector he became a prosecutor, becoming known as a "crimefighter", since he led many investigations into organised crime. Teeven was involved in the prosecutions of Dési Bouterse, Mink Kok, Johan Verhoek, as well as Willem Holleeder.

Politics 
In 2002, Teeven succeeded Pim Fortuyn as frontrunner (lijsttrekker) of Livable Netherlands (Leefbaar Nederland). From 23 May 2002 to 30 January 2003, he was parliamentary leader of Livable Netherlands in the House of Representatives and also a member of the House of Representatives from 23 May 2002 to 30 January 2003. After he found out he would not be frontrunner in the 2003 election, he quit the party and returned to his former post of public prosecutor.

In 2006, Teeven announced his return to politics, this time for the People's Party for Freedom and Democracy (VVD). For the general election of 2006, he was sixth on the candidate list for the VVD; he was elected into House of Representatives on 30 November 2006. He was the main spokesperson for justice policy.

For the general election of 2010 he was third on the candidate list for the VVD. After the cabinet formation of 2010 for the First Rutte cabinet, Teeven became State Secretary for Security and Justice taking office on 14 October 2010 and resigned the same day as a member of the House of Representatives. On 5 November 2012, he continued as State Secretary for Security and Justice under the Second Rutte cabinet. Meanwhile, he was a member of the House of Representatives again from 20 September 2012 to 5 November 2012. As State Secretary for Security and Justice he was tasked with dealing with prevention, family law, youth justice, in addition to copyright law.

On 10 March 2015 Justice Minister Ivo Opstelten resigned together with Teeven after the former had informed the House of Representatives wrongly in the early 2000s on a deal made by Teeven as a state prosecutor in 1994. The deal concerned money paid to a drug trafficker whose money had been seized and received compensation after the origin of the money could not be proved to be illegal. Opstelten had mentioned to the House of Representatives a lower amount than the one that was actually paid, as well as that the receipt of the transaction had gone missing, while it later surfaced. In the wake of this affair, House Speaker Anouchka van Miltenburg, a member of the same political party as both Teeven and Opstelten, resigned on 12 December 2015 when it became clear she had suppressed two letters of a whistleblower from the justice ministry who had already mentioned the right details on the deal, by putting the letters through the shredder. After resigning as State Secretary Teeven served as member of the House of Representatives between 26 March 2015 and 23 March 2017.

Teeven currently works as a part-time bus driver for public transportation company Connexxion in North Holland and as a consultant for public relations and cybercrime. Amid the 2022 Russian invasion of Ukraine, as a bus driver, Teeven drove Ukrainian conflict orphans to the Netherlands.

Decorations

References

External links

Official
  Mr. F. (Fred) Teeven MPM Parlement & Politiek

 

 

 

1958 births
Living people
Bus drivers
Dutch consultants
Dutch fiscal jurists
Dutch prosecutors
Dutch public relations people
Knights of the Order of Orange-Nassau
Leaders of political parties in the Netherlands
Livable Netherlands politicians
Members of the House of Representatives (Netherlands)
People associated with computer security
People from Amstelveen
Politicians from Haarlem
People's Party for Freedom and Democracy politicians
State Secretaries for Justice of the Netherlands
Tax collectors
University of Twente alumni
Vrije Universiteit Amsterdam alumni
20th-century Dutch civil servants
21st-century Dutch civil servants
21st-century Dutch politicians